In the November 1989 general election, the following offices were up for election in the United States Commonwealth of Virginia:

Governor
Lieutenant Governor
Attorney General
House of Delegates (100 members)

Governor

Lieutenant Governor

Candidates
L. Douglas Wilder, Virginia State Senator (D)
John Chichester, Virginia State Senator (R)

Results

Attorney General

Candidates
Mary Sue Terry, Virginia State Delegate (D)
Buster O'Brien, attorney (R)

House of Delegates

References

 
Virginia